Jan Paweł Pawłowski  (born 18 November 1992) is a Polish professional footballer who plays as a striker for Jagiellonia Białystok II.

Career

Pawłowski started his career with Jagiellonia Białystok.

References

Notes

 
 Profile at jagiellonia.neostrada.pl
 Profile at jagiellonia.pl

Polish footballers
1992 births
Living people
People from Sokółka
Jagiellonia Białystok players
Bruk-Bet Termalica Nieciecza players
Olimpia Grudziądz players
Ekstraklasa players
I liga players
III liga players
Sportspeople from Podlaskie Voivodeship
Association football forwards